Fredrick Leslie Wood III (born December 1, 1945) is an American physician and politician who has served as a member of the Idaho House of Representatives since 2006.

Early life and education
Wood was raised in Homedale, Idaho. Beginning in the eighth grade, Wood attended Georgia Military Academy. He earned his bachelor's degree from Tulane University and his medical degree from Tulane University School of Medicine, after which he served in the United States Air Force.

Career 
Wood moved to Burley in 1977 where he was a practicing physician. From 1996 to 2004, Wood served on the Idaho Fish and Game Commission.

When long-time legislator and former Speaker of the Idaho House of Representatives Bruce Newcomb decided to not seek reelection in 2006, Wood entered a four-way race for the Republican nomination which he won. He has run unopposed each term since. In the House, Wood served as chair of the Heath and Welfare Committee.

Elections

References

External links
Fred Wood at the Idaho Legislature
 

1945 births
Living people
Republican Party members of the Idaho House of Representatives
People from Burley, Idaho
People from Washington, D.C.
Tulane University School of Medicine alumni
Tulane University alumni
United States Air Force airmen
21st-century American politicians
Woodward Academy alumni